The Gylne Gutuer is a single-day road cycling race held annually in Norway since 2018. It is part of UCI Europe Tour in category 1.2.

The race is part of the Uno - X Development Weekend, which takes place in late August and early September in the provinces of Hedmark and Oppland in Norway. It includes three races: the Hafjell GP, the Lillehammer GP and Gylne Gutuer.

Winners

References

External links

Cycle races in Norway
UCI Europe Tour races
Recurring sporting events established in 2018